Blabia masoni is a species of beetle in the family Cerambycidae. It was described by Per Olof Christopher Aurivillius in 1927. It is known from Colombia.

References

Blabia
Beetles described in 1927